Angie Asimus (born 12 August 1985) is a news presenter and journalist.

Asimus is currently a weather presenter on Seven News Sydney and presents Seven News at 5.

Career
Asimus was originally from Gundagai (in rural New South Wales) before moving to Sydney to study Media Communications at the University of Sydney. She received a Graduate Certificate in Climate Adaptation in 2012 from the University of Southern Queensland.

Asimus started her career as a journalist in 2008 with Seven Queensland working at their Townsville newsroom. In 2010, she was moved to Seven's Brisbane Newsroom initially as the court reporter.

During the 2011 floods Asimus presented the weather then soon after moved into the role of weekend weather presenter on a full-time basis. While doing this she completed a tertiary studies in climatology from the University of Southern Queensland.

In 2012, Asimus started working as a fill-in news presenter with Patrick Condren. She also previously filled in for Kay McGrath and Sharyn Ghidella regularly.

On 12 July 2013, Asimus made her national debut as a news presenter on Seven Morning News and Seven Afternoon News filling in for Ann Sanders.

In January 2014, Asimus moved back to Sydney, as a reporter with Seven News in Sydney and presenting the weather on Friday and Saturday.

In 2016, Asimus was appointed presenter of Seven News at 5 which airs on Saturday and Sunday.

In November 2020, Asimus was promoted to the position of Sunday to Thursday weather presenter, after David Brown returned to Melbourne.

Asimus is also a regular fill in presenter on Sunrise and Weekend Sunrise.

Personal life 
In December 2019, Asimus announced that she was expecting her first child. 

She gave birth to her son in April 2020.

In February 2020, Asimus married her partner of 12 years, Chris Abbott. 

In August 2022, Asimus announced that she is expecting her second child. 

She gave birth to her girl in January 2023.

References 

Seven News presenters
Living people
Journalists from Sydney
University of Sydney alumni
University of Southern Queensland alumni
1985 births